June P. Morgan (July 12, 1917 – September 28, 1998) was a judge on the Missouri Supreme Court from 1969 until 1982, and the chief justice of that same court from 1977 to 1979. Morgan authored a 1982 decision declaring that pension benefits accrued during a marriage are marital property, rather than the separate property of the person who earned the pension. He also wrote a 1976 decision saying it was constitutional to provide public tuition grants to college students who attended private colleges, and a 1978 decision upholding industrial development corporations, which permit low-interest financing for businesses.

Sources

1917 births
1998 deaths
Chief Justices of the Supreme Court of Missouri
20th-century American judges
Judges of the Supreme Court of Missouri
University of Missouri School of Law alumni
People from Lincoln County, Missouri
Northwest Missouri State University alumni